The automobile salesperson is one of many sales professions. The automobile salesman is a retail salesperson, who sells new or used cars. Unlike traditional retail sales, car sales are sometimes negotiable. Salesmen are employed by new car dealerships or used car dealerships.

Car negotiation
The price of a car, unlike many retail sales, is often negotiable. New cars will often have a factory window sticker (Monroney sticker in the US) listing equipment and options, and the suggested retail price or MSRP. The salesman is traditionally paid a commission rather than a fixed salary, usually based on a combination of profit margin and unit volume.

Popular culture
The automobile salesman, particularly the used car salesman, has often been a source of characters, often negative, in movies, television shows, and cartoons. History and fairy tales often characterize peddlers (people selling goods) as negative influences, or outsiders out to take advantage of people. Such salesmen are often well aware of their occupation's negative public image. As Valerie Biden Owens explained, Joe Biden Sr. left automobile sales for real estate when his son Joe Biden Jr. was elected to the United States Senate in 1972, because "he didn't want a United States senator to have a used-car salesman for a dad." It is a common theme for the "used car salesman" to be cast as a shyster in popular culture.

References

Sales occupations
Auto dealerships